Cycas nongnoochiae is a species of cycad in Thailand. It is found only on limestone outcrops in Tak Fa District, Nakhon Sawan Province, central Thailand.

References

nongnoochiae
Endemic flora of Thailand